State Council may refer to:

Government 
 State Council of the People's Republic of China, the national cabinet and chief administrative authority of China, headed by the Premier
 State Council of the Republic of Korea, the national cabinet of South Korea, headed by the President

Legislature
 State Council of Crimea, the legislative branch of the Republic of Crimea

Advisory body
 State Council (Russia), advisory body to the President of Russia

Former organizations 
 State Council of the Soviet Union, was the chief administrative authority of the Union of Soviet Socialist Republics (USSR)
  (中華民國國務院), was the chief executive authority and national cabinet of the Beijing-based Beiyang government of the Republic of China
 State Council of the Republic of China, was the supreme authority of the Nanjing-based national government of the Republic of China
 Iowa State Council for Defense, the council that approved the official state flag of Iowa
 State Council of Ceylon, the legislative body created in colonial Ceylon (present-day Sri Lanka) under the Donoughmore Constitution
 State Council of the Russian Empire, the supreme state advisory body to the Tsar in Imperial Russia
 State Council of Joseon, the highest organ of government under the Joseon Dynasty of Korea
 State Council (German-Austria), the executive leadership of the Republic of German-Austria, established in the last days of World War I 
 State Council of East Germany, the head of state in East Germany from 1960 to 1990.
 State Council of the Principality of Bulgaria, an organ established by the Second Grand National Assembly that lasted during Alexander's period of authoritarian rule (1881-1883)
 State Council of the People's Republic of Bulgaria, the highest organ of government in the People's Republic of Bulgaria from 1971 to 1990.
 State National Council, a communist-controlled, parliament-like body formed in the late stages of the Second World War in German-occupied Warsaw
 State Council of Romania, the supreme executive authority of the Socialist Republic of Romania from 1961 to 1989.
 State Council of Slovakia, the upper house of the parliament of the Slovak State (1939–1945)
In military:
 State Defense Council, the military committee of the Chechen Republic of Ichkeria
 State Peace and Development Council, the military regime of Myanmar

In other fields:
 New York State Council on the Arts, an arts council serving the U.S. state of New York
 Old North State Council, a local council of the Boy Scouts of America that serves the western Piedmont Triad region of North Carolina
 Seventh-day Adventist Church State Council, a non-profit organization that works to preserve and promote religious freedom

See also
 Council of State
 National Council (disambiguation)
 State Council of Education (disambiguation)
 State councillor (disambiguation)
 State Counsel

Government institutions